MFK Slovan Giraltovce is a Slovak football team, based in the town of Giraltovce. The club was founded in 1916.

Famous coach
  Jozef Bubenko

References

External links 
Club profile at Futbalnet.sk portal 
Club profile at Ligy.sk portal 
  
at giraltovce.sk 

Football clubs in Slovakia
Association football clubs established in 1916
1916 establishments in Slovakia